The Bitter Dawn is a 1988 film by Mahmoud Shoolizadeh. It is a story about a young boy who is very interested in taking photos and while learning how to take pictures academically, he tries to experience it himself. In the morning when he hears the Iran islamic revolution Leader's death, he comes to the streets anxiously to record the reactions of the people to this important news.

This film was broadcast on Iranian television in 1988 and became a topic for discussion within the Iranian media of the time.

Technical specifications and film crew
The Bitter Dawn
Betacam sp, 25min, fiction, Iran, 1988
Script writer and Director: Mahmoud Shoolizadeh,
Photograph: Ghorbani,
Edit: Aslani,
Producer: Jarmooz ( I.R.I.B, Isfahan )

1988 drama films
1988 films